Keolis Amey Operations, trading as Transport for Wales Rail Services (TfW Rail Services) was a Welsh train operating company owned by Keolis (60%) and Amey (40%) that operated the Wales & Borders franchise between October 2018 and February 2021.

The Welsh Government body Transport for Wales awarded the contract for the Wales and Borders franchise to KeolisAmey in 2018 which commenced rail operations on 14 October 2018. KeolisAmey used the brand names Transport for Wales and TfW Rail ( and ), which are owned by the Welsh Government, for day-to-day operations. The Welsh Government nationalised the franchise on 7 February 2021, transferring operations to Transport for Wales Rail, although KeolisAmey continues to provide an infrastructural role in the franchise.

History

In October 2016 four bids were shortlisted for the next Wales & Borders franchise: Abellio, the incumbent operator Arriva, a Keolis/Amey joint venture, and MTR Corporation.

In October 2017, Arriva withdrew from the bidding process, followed in February 2018 by Abellio, after the collapse of its partner Carillion. In May 2018, the franchise was awarded to KeolisAmey Wales. It commenced on 14 October 2018 and it was to run for 15 years.

Unlike the previous franchise, which was awarded by the Department for Transport, this franchise was awarded by Transport for Wales, on behalf of the Welsh Government.

In January 2020 Keolis Amey was fined £2.3 million by the Welsh government for poor performance of rail services. The company is also expected to be criticised by the Welsh Language Commissioner later in 2020 for reportedly breaking legislation on Welsh language provision six times since taking over the franchise in 2018. KeolisAmey Wales told the BBC that it did not believe any rules had been broken. Complaints included that Welsh was given lesser treatment on self-service machines, websites, and on the mobile app, that correspondence was not issued fully in Welsh, that train tickets were printed only in English, and that station and train announcements were not always made bilingually.

With a collapse in revenues, and a significant reduction in passenger numbers as a result of the COVID-19 pandemic having made the original franchise financially unviable, on 7 February 2021 the franchise was taken over by the Welsh Government's operator of last resort, Transport for Wales Rail, a subsidiary of Transport for Wales, with AmeyKeolis Infrastructure having an involvement in delivering some key projects such as the Core Valley Lines.

Services
Typical TfW weekday off-peak service was as follows:

Rolling Stock
KeolisAmey Wales inherited a fleet of Class 142, Class 143, Class 150, Class 153, Class 158, Class 175s diesel multiple units and Mark 3 carriages from Arriva Trains Wales in October 2018.

In 2019 and 2020, more Class 153 units, Class 170 units and Mark 4 carriages were acquired from other operators. In November 2020, the first three Class 769 units entered service. These allowed for the Class 142 and Mark 3 sets to be withdrawn.

Class 143 Pacer

KeolisAmey Wales operated 15 Class 143 units. All had advertising vinyls applied, with the messages 'The start of a new journey', 'The journey is almost over for old trains', and 'These trains will terminate soon', stating rolling stock, infrastructure and service improvements.

From 1 January 2021, the Class 143 units were only able to operate coupled to (a) PRM-compliant unit(s), and the toilets were locked out of use due to Network Rail no longer wanting waste from non-tanked toilets being dropped onto their tracks. The last Class 143 unit ran in May 2021.

Class 150, 158 and 175 DMUs
KeolisAmey Wales operated 36 Class 150, 24 Class 158 and 27 Class 175 units.

Class 153 Super Sprinters
In April 2019, KeolisAmey Wales added five 153 units acquired from Great Western Railway to the eight it previously had. Four of these entered service the following month, while the fifth entered service on 21 October 2019 as the first 153 on the whole GB rail network with PRM modifications.

In October 2019, Porterbrook announced that it would lease a further nine Class 153 units to KeolisAmey Wales for use on a short-term basis. These comprise five units from Greater Anglia which entered service in January 2020, and four units from East Midlands Railway which entered service in February 2020. In November 2020, two more units arrived from East Midlands Railway.

Class 170 Turbostars
In September 2019, KeolisAmey Wales took delivery of the first of 12 Class 170 Turbostar DMUs from Abellio Greater Anglia. , Transport for Wales operated the 12 Class 170 units on the Maesteg/Cardiff/Ebbw Vale-Cheltenham routes.

Class 769 Flex
Nine Class 769 Flex bi-mode multiple units were due to be delivered by 2019, following conversion from Class 319 electric multiple units, by fitting diesel generators and extra electronic equipment to some previously unused below-solebar space. The first three units entered service in November and December 2020.

Fleet at end of franchise

Train maintenance depots
KeolisAmey Wales's fleet was stored and maintained at the following depots.

 Cardiff Canton: Class 143, 150, 153, 170 and 769s and locomotive-hauled trains
 Chester (Alstom): Class 175s
 Machynlleth: Class 158s
 Holyhead: Stabling point (refuelling and light maintenance) for locomotive-hauled trains and DMUs
 Crewe Carriage Sidings (Arriva TrainCare): Class 150, Class 153 and Class 158 units, and locomotive-hauled trains. Stabling point and light maintenance.

Due to space limitations, Chrysalis Rail allowed KeolisAmey Wales to store any unallocated units or carriages at its Landore TMD in Swansea, even if they were not being worked on.

Past fleet
From June 2019 to March 2020, KeolisAmey Wales hired two Class 37-hauled Mark 2 sets to temporarily operate rush-hour services between Cardiff and Rhymney to add capacity. From January 2020 they were operating under PRM non-compliance dispensation, but were withdrawn in March due to decreasing reliability and replaced with trains formed of multiple Class 153 railcars coupled together, with many more of those in the fleet.

In July 2020, all of KeolisAmey Wales's Mark 3 stock (which had been inherited from Arriva Trains Wales) went off lease and into storage at Long Marston.

Notes

References

External links

Keolis
Railway companies established in 2018
Railway companies disestablished in 2021
Railway companies of Wales
Rail transport in Shropshire
Rail transport in Wales
Train operating companies in the United Kingdom
Transport in Cardiff
Transport operators of Wales
2018 establishments in Wales
2021 disestablishments in Wales